The Finn Gold Cup is the premier competition in Finn Class sailboat racing. Organized by the International Sailing Federation, it decides the Finn World Championships and has been held every year since 1956.

Finn is an Olympic class.

Editions

Medalists

Multiple medallists

See also
ISAF Sailing World Championships
International Sailing Federation

References

External links 
 Sailing competitions
 TheFinnChannel, youtube.com

 
Recurring sporting events established in 1956
World championships in sailing